Walter Aspden (1907-1987) was an American soccer inside forward who played professionally in the first American Soccer League.

Aspden won the 1926 National Amateur Cup with the New Bedford Defenders.

Aspden signed with the Newark Skeeters during the 1927-1928 American Soccer League season, but moved to the New Bedford Whalers after playing only one game for the Skeeters.  On June 9, 1929, he scored one of three Whalers goals in the defeat of the Fall River Marksmen in the ASL playoff semifinals.  By the fall of 1929, the American Soccer League was beginning its collapse and Aspden jumped from team to team, seeing games with four teams between the fall of 1929 and the fall of 1931.  In December 1933, he is listed with the amateur New Bedford Defenders.

External links

References

1907 births
1987 deaths
American soccer players
American Soccer League (1921–1933) players
Boston Bears players
New Bedford Whalers players
New York Giants (soccer) players
Newark Skeeters players
Pawtucket Rangers players
Association football forwards